Vaivara is a village in Narva-Jõesuu, Ida-Viru County in northeastern Estonia. During World War II, Vaivara concentration camp, the primary Nazi concentration camp in Estonia, was located near Vaivara train station.

References

Kreis Wierland
Villages in Ida-Viru County